{{Infobox basketball club
| name          = Rochester RazorSharks
| color1        = #9CE4FA
| color2        = #000000
| logo          = RazorsharksPBL.PNG
| founded       = 2005
| folded        = 2018
| leagues       = American Basketball Association2005–2007Premier Basketball League2008–2017, 2020, 2022North American Premier Basketball2018| history       = Rochester RazorSharks2005–2018
| arena         = 
| location      = Rochester, New York
| colors        = Gray, blue, and black
| ceo           = 
| coach         = 
| owner         = 
| gm = 
| championships = 8 (2006 ABA, 2008, 2009, 2011, 2014, 2015, 2016, 2017 PBL)
}}

The Rochester RazorSharks' are an inactive professional basketball team based in Rochester, New York. The RazorSharks were founded in 2005 as a member of the American Basketball Association (ABA). They remained in the ABA until 2007, leaving the league to become founding members of the Premier Basketball League (PBL). The RazorSharks have won eight championships to date – the 2006 ABA championship and PBL titles in 2008, 2009, 2011, 2014, 2015, 2016, and 2017. The team joined the new North American Premier Basketball for the 2018 season and planned to play in The Basketball League in 2019 before the team decided to sit out the season.

The RazorSharks announced in August 2019 that the team would return in a re-launched PBL for the 2020 season with the franchise rights acquired by Mooreland Productions, LLC, a local entertainment company, and have stated they will play in a new venue. The ownership opened a new recreation center called Fast Break Sports for the team to play home games in late 2020, while the team also joined the Pro Basketball Association (PBA) for the 2021 season.

History

2005–2006
The Rochester RazorSharks were founded in 2005 as an American Basketball Association expansion team. The RazorSharks had much success during their first season, as they finished their inaugural regular season at 26–4, ranked #1 in the ABA Pit Bull Power Rankings, and were named as one of ProBasketBallNews.com's Top 10 Minor League teams.  They also led the ABA in attendance. Their regular season high was 6,192 against Indiana. Due to their success at the gate, Rochester hosted the 2006 ABA Great Eight Tournament. On March 26, the RazorSharks won the ABA championship, defeating the SoCal Legends 117–114 in front of a then franchise record crowd of 6,377.

The RazorSharks won a league title in their first season, which continued a Rochester basketball tradition: a league title in a team's first season. The Rochester Royals won the 1950–51 National Basketball Association championship and the Rochester Zeniths captured the 1978–79 Continental Basketball Association title.

2006–2007
During the team's first off-season, the RazorSharks re-signed head coach Rod Baker. The deal was a two-year contract, keeping the 2005–06 ABA Coach of the Year in Rochester until the end of the 2007–2008 season. Despite the loss of 2006 ABA MVP Chris Carrawell, the RazorSharks reloaded by signing key players such as C/F Mike Mackell and including the mid-season pickup of G/F Ricky Price.

The team opened the season with two wins on the road, returning to Rochester for their 2006 home opener on November 16, a 107–93 win over the rival Buffalo Silverbacks. Two days later on November 18, ABA Commissioner John Salley presented the players and staff with their championship rings, and helped hoist the 2005–06 ABA Championship banner to the rafters of the Blue Cross Arena. A 124–114 win over the Maryland Nighthawks followed the ceremony.

On December 28, the RazorSharks beat the Cape Cod Frenzy 92–88. The win was the franchise's 24th consecutive home victory, eclipsing the local pro basketball record set by the 1949–50 Rochester Royals and the 1978–79 Rochester Zeniths. The announced attendance of 7,858 was not only a franchise high, but a local high for a pro basketball game. The RazorSharks finished the regular season with an 18–0 home record, extending their home win streak to 35 consecutive wins in the process.  It had been over a year since the franchise's last home loss. The Niagara DareDevils had beaten Rochester on November 24, 2005.

On March 22, the RazorSharks announced they were leaving the ABA to help form the new Premier Basketball League.

2008
The team's first year in the PBL was very successful, finishing with an 18–2 record and the top seed in the league playoffs.  Following first and second-round byes, they defeated the Reading Railers 100–76 for a berth in the championship game. Rochester's success came despite a large turnover of players, as there were only four holdovers from the 2007 team (James Reaves, John Halas, Demond Stewart, and Keith Friel).

On March 30, the RazorSharks won the PBL's inaugural championship, defeating the Arkansas Impact 142–112.  Another notable incident in the title game was forward Sammy Monroe grabbing the rim for a rebound and shattering the backboard in the process.  The glass shrapnel injured teammate James "Mook" Reaves and delayed the game for 45 minutes while the backboard was replaced and medical staff tended to Reaves' injuries. For the championship game Rochester had a record crowd with 9,717 in attendance, a record which still stands today.

2009
Reaves, Friel and Jerice Crouch returned to the Sharks in 2009, along with role players Ron Rollerson and Steve Hailey. Chris Iversen was promoted from the front office to assistant coach during the off-season.

The team struggled early, losing three of their first four games. On January 19, the Vermont Frost Heaves ended Rochester's 48-game home winning streak. However, the RazorSharks won all 15 remaining regular-season games to finish the regular season 17–3, winning the league's Eastern Division and the second seed in the PBL playoffs. The PBL semifinals pitted the RazorSharks against the third-seeded Manchester Millrats. The teams split the first two games of the best-of-three series, the visitor winning each game. Back at the BCA, the Sharks won Game 3 110–103 to advance to the PBL championship series.

Due to arena difficulties in Battle Creek, the PBL announced that the planned three-game series would instead be a single game held on April 19 in Rochester.
The RazorSharks won the game easily 152–115. Sammy Monroe shattered the backboard again delaying the games for 45 minutes in the first quarter.

2011
After starting the season 2–6, the RazorSharks finished the season 12–8, good for a third-place finish in the league. Rochester defeated Quebec and Lawton-Fort Sill in three-game series for the franchise's fourth title in six seasons.

2013–14
In 2013–14 the RazorSharks would win their first PBL championship title in three years after finishing 17–1 during the regular season and defeating the Indianapolis Diesels two games to one. Jerice Crouch would be named the Playoff MVP.

2015
In a strong effort to win their first set of back-to-back titles since 2008 and 2009, the RazorSharks added new head coach, former scout of the Cleveland Cavaliers and 2010–'11 PBL Coach of the Year, Robert Spon. Also Chris Iversen, who has been with the RazorSharks every year since inception, minus the 2013–14 season will be returning as an assistant coach. The RazorSharks would go on to complete the perfect season after going undefeated (15–0) in the regular season and sweep the Lake Michigan Admirals in a close series to win the league's 2015 PBL Championship. This would mark the team's fifth Premier Basketball League title and sixth overall in history.

2016
In 2016, Rochester was able to turn around a disappointing 2–2 start by promoting long time assistant, Chris Iversen to the head coaching position.  Iversen went undefeated for the remainder of the season, winning 16 straight regular season games, plus three postseason match-ups, finishing with a sweep of the Lake Michigan Admirals in the best of three PBL Championship Series.  The 2016 title was the third straight PBL Championship for the RazorSharks, and their seventh total in team history.

Since 2018
The team joined the new North American Premier Basketball for the 2018 season and planned to play in The Basketball League in 2019 before the team decided to sit out the season.

The RazorSharks announced in August 2019 that the team would return in a re-launched PBL for the 2020 season under the ownership of Mooreland Productions, LLC, a local entertainment company, and stated they will play in a new venue. That did not happen due to the COVID-19 pandemic. The ownership opened a new recreation center, Fast Break Sports, in Batavia, New York, for the team to play home games in late 2020, while the team also joined the Pro Basketball Association (PBA) for the 2021 season. The team also did not play that season.

On September 1, 2021, the team announced that it rebranded as the Fast Break Fury, but Mooreland Productions later issued a press release stating that there would be no rebranding, that the agreement with the RazorSharks would not be renewed, and the Fast Break Fury would be a separate franchise.

Year-by-year results

The RazorSharks have made the championship series every year of their existence besides (2007). They boast a record of 7–3 in the championship.

 Retired numbers 

CoachesNote: Statistics are correct through the end of the 2020 season.''

References

External links
Official Website
Great Eight Tournament

Premier Basketball League teams
Razorsharks
Basketball teams in New York (state)
Basketball teams established in 2005
2005 establishments in New York (state)